Beșghioz is a commune and village in the Gagauz Autonomous Territorial Unit of the Republic of Moldova.  The 2004 census listed the commune as having a population of 3,391 people.  93% of its population are Gagauz. Minorities included 76 Russians, 66 Bulgarians, and 46 Moldovans.

Its geographical coordinates are 46° 7' 18" North, 28° 52' 20" East.

The former governor (or başkan) of Gagauzia (2006-2015), Mihail Formuzal, was born in Beșghioz in 1959.

References

Communes of Gagauzia